Teluk Gong (Jawi: تلوق ڬوڠ) is a fishing village near Pulau Indah within Port Klang in the state of Selangor. Formerly a traditional agricultural locale, Teluk Gong is currently surrounded by industrial areas consisting of an unplanned concentration of medium and heavy industries due to its proximity and accessibility to West Port. Large tract of former tapioca, cocoa, coconut and oil-palm plantations are being leveled and replaced by high and wide steel structure go-downs.

Teluk Gong is known for its seafood, as there are several Chinese seafood restaurants in this area.

External links
Teluk Gong - Information, Travel and Food Guide

Klang District
Villages in Selangor